Babu Mani ( – 19 November 2022) was an Indian footballer who played for India as a forward in the 1984 AFC Asian Cup. He also played for Mohun Bagan. He also played for East Bengal under the coaching of Syed Nayeemuddin.

Mani made his international debut against Argentina in the 1984 Nehru Cup. He was part of the squad which qualified and participated in the 1984 AFC Asian Cup.

Honours

India
 South Asian Games Gold medal: 1985, 1987

Bengal
 Santosh Trophy: 1986–87, 1988–89

 Mohammedan Sporting
Federation Cup: 1983–84

Mohun Bagan
Calcutta Football League: 1984, 1986, 1992
IFA Shield: 1987
Durand Cup: 1984, 1985, 1986
Rovers Cup: 1985, 1992
Federation Cup: 1986–87, 1987–88, 1992, 1993

East Bengal
Calcutta Football League: 1991
IFA Shield: 1990, 1991
Durand Cup: 1990, 1991
Rovers Cup: 1990

References

External links
 Stats
 

1963 births
2022 deaths
Footballers from Bangalore
Indian footballers
India international footballers
1984 AFC Asian Cup players
Footballers at the 1986 Asian Games
Association football forwards
Mohammedan SC (Kolkata) players
Mohun Bagan AC players
East Bengal Club players
Calcutta Football League players
Asian Games competitors for India
South Asian Games medalists in football
South Asian Games gold medalists for India